John Monckton (1695 – 15 July 1751) of Serlby, Nottinghamshire, was a British landowner and Whig politician who sat in the House of Commons between 1727 and 1751. He was elevated to the Irish peerage as the first Viscount Galway in 1727.

Early life

John Monckton was the eldest son of Theodosia ( Fountaine) Monckton and Robert Monckton (1659–1722), Lord of the manors of Cavil, near Howden, and Hodroyd, near Barnsley, Yorkshire.  A strong opponent of the policies of James II, Robert Monckton had gone into exile in the Netherlands and returned with the invading army of William III in the Glorious Revolution of 1688. This established a strong family connection with the Whig party and Robert had gone on to win the borough of Pontefract from the Tories in the general election of 1695, and later to represent Aldborough.

His father was the eldest son of Sir Philip Monckton of Cavil and the former Anne Eyre (a daughter of Robert Eyre of Highlow Hall). His mother was the daughter and heiress of John Fountaine of Melton-on-the-Hill, Yorkshire.

Monckton was educated at Trinity Hall, Cambridge, which he entered in 1713.

Career
Monckton stood unsuccessfully as a Whig candidate for Clitheroe at the 1722 British general election. Victory in the seat depended on control of burgages. Having bought a number of burgages to no effect, Monckton decided to sell them to Sir Nathaniel Curzon, one of the victorious Tory candidates. As part of the deal, Curzon deferred to Monckton for the following parliament, and he was duly elected MP for Clitheroe at the 1727 British general election. On 17 July 1727 the grateful Whig government of Robert Walpole made Monckton Viscount Galway and Baron of Killard, both in the Irish peerage. An Irish peerage allowed the holder to continue sitting in the British parliament, and was a way of honouring a useful political ally.

In 1729 Galway purchased 77 burgages in Pontefract, his father's former constituency, for £6000 from the Bland, Dawnay, Frank families. This placed himself and Sir William Lowther in joint control of the borough and they agreed to nominate a member each at subsequent elections. When Galway's tenure at Clitheroe elapsed at the 1734 British general election, he was elected MP for Pontefract, along with Lowther. Subsequently, he profited   from offices in the patronage of the government. In 1734, he  was appointed Commissioner of Revenue in Ireland, a post he held until 1748. He was returned again for Pontefract at the  1741 British general election, but at the  1747 British general election, he ceded it to his eldest son.

In 1749 Monckton was recommended for the post of Surveyor-General of Lands, Woods and Forests in England and Wales by the Prime Minister, his brother-in-law, Henry Pelham. Writing to his brother, the Duke of Newcastle, Pelham pointed out that "the great expense he has been at in bringing himself in, and, at last, his purchasing a borough are merits we don't meet with every day."

Galway held the post of Surveyor General and the Pontefract constituency until his death in 1751.

Personal life

Monckton's first wife was Lady Elizabeth Manners (1709–1730), daughter of John Manners, 2nd Duke of Rutland and the former Catherine Russell (daughter of William Russell, Lord Russell and Lady Rachel Wriothesley). Before her death on 22 March 1730, they were the parents of:

 William Monckton-Arundell (1725–1772), later 2nd Viscount Galway.
 Robert Monckton (1726–1782), notable Army General and colonial administrator; he never married, but was survived by three sons and a daughter. 

Galway married as his second wife Jane Westenra, daughter of Henry Warner Westenra of Rathleagh, Queen's County, Ireland in November 1734. Together, they were the parents of:

 John Monckton (1739–1830), of Fineshade Abbey, Northamptonshire.
 Henry Monckton (1740–1778), a notable army officer killed at the Battle of Monmouth, New Jersey.
 Edward Monckton (1744–1832), of Somerford, Staffordshire, an MP for 32 years; he married Sophia, the illegitimate daughter of George Pigot.
 Mary Monckton (1748–1840), a notable literary and political hostess who married Edmund Boyle, 7th Earl of Cork.

Lord Galway died on 15 July 1751. Lady Galway survived him until 1788.

Estates

Upon his father's death in 1722, Monckton inherited the family estate of Hodroyd Hall which had been the seat of the Moncktons since the early 17th century. In 1725 he purchased the Serlby estate in North Nottinghamshire and began the building of the new family seat of Serlby Hall, where he built up a notable collection of paintings. He was a member of the Society of Dilettanti.

References

Whig (British political party) MPs
Alumni of Trinity Hall, Cambridge
1695 births
1751 deaths
Members of the Parliament of Great Britain for English constituencies
British MPs 1727–1734
British MPs 1734–1741
British MPs 1741–1747
British MPs 1747–1754
Viscounts in the Peerage of Ireland
Peers of Ireland created by George II